The Gaither Vocal Band is an American southern gospel vocal group, named after its founder and leader Bill Gaither. On March 1, 2017, it was announced that the Gaither Vocal Band lineup consisted of Reggie Smith, Wes Hampton, Adam Crabb, Todd Suttles, and Bill Gaither. Although the group started out recording contemporary Christian music in the 1980s, it became known for southern gospel after the popularity of the Gaither Homecoming videos.

The lineup of the band changes often, with artists leaving to work on solo careers, and new and old ones coming to replace them. Besides Bill Gaither, singers with the longest tenure in the band include Guy Penrod (1995–2008), Mark Lowry (1988–2002, 2009–13), Michael English (1985–94, 2009–13), David Phelps (1997–2005, 2009–17) and Wes Hampton (2005–present).

The band has released 29 albums (not including compilations), at least 19 of which have charted. The band has also released 10 DVDs, which feature many other Christian artists as well. The Gaither Vocal Band has been honored with two Grammys and 17 Dove Awards.

History

Beginnings
The Gaither Vocal Band is named after gospel legend and leader Bill Gaither. It was the successor-group of the Bill Gaither Trio. By the 1980s, Bill Gaither, along with wife Gloria Gaither, were both very successful songwriters. For example, their song, "He Touched Me" was covered by Elvis Presley, after which he even named his album He Touched Me. Presley won a Grammy for the album. Bill Gaither felt that his trio had reached its peak in the mid-1980s, but his desire to make another gospel hit kept the trio going.

The original Vocal Band (called the New Gaither Vocal Band) was formed spontaneously, backstage of a Gaither Trio concert. It consisted of Bill Gaither and Gary McSpadden of the trio, along with two of the trio's backup singers, Steve Green and Lee Young. The quartet sang "Your First Day in Heaven" on stage that night. Their debut album, the self-titled The New Gaither Vocal Band, debuted in 1981.

According to the liner notes of the CD compilation The Best of the GVB, the term "vocal band" was used instead of "quartet" because it did not limit Gaither in terms of sound or number of group members. According to Steve Green on the Gaither Vocal Band Reunion video, he came up with the name and convinced Gaither to use it because he, at the time, did not want to be associated with "quartet music".

Lee Young left the group in 1982, and Jon Mohr was hired as the new bass singer. They then recorded the album Passin' The Faith Along. Later, tenor Steve Green left and Larnelle Harris was hired. This group cut the New Point Of View album before Mohr left.

Widespread popularity
Michael English was hired as the new lead singer, so McSpadden was moved down to baritone, and Gaither dropped to the lowest part. At this point the group dropped the "new" part of their name. Although the previous album (New Point of View) had been more contemporary than its predecessors, the album with this version of the group (One X 1) took it even further. After this album, Larnelle left and was replaced by Lemuel Miller. The group did not record an album with Lemuel before he too left. He was replaced by Imperials alumnus, Jim Murray. This line up cut one album (Wings) before Gary McSpadden left to start his solo career. Mark Lowry was convinced to replace him. Along with a great voice, Lowry added comedy to the mix. Their Gospel roots project Homecoming in 1991 caused most Southern Gospel fans to welcome the Vocal Band with open arms. Jim Murray left and was replaced by Terry Franklin. The album Southern Classics was released in 1993 with the hit "I Bowed On My Knees". (This song was co-writers by Jeremy Ward)

Later Michael English left. He was replaced by Buddy Mullins. Mullins was only a temporary fill-in, but he was included on the album Testify. Terry Franklin soon left and was replaced by yet another Imperials alumnus, Jonathan Pierce (formerly known as Jonathan Hildreth, his first and last name—then changed to his first and middle name). Strengthened by the popularity of the Homecoming video series, the Vocal Band added Guy Penrod at lead. After Pierce's departure, Gaither hired David Phelps at tenor. After Lowry's departure, Imperials alumnus Russ Taff sang baritone for a couple of years. Marshall Hall was his replacement. Wes Hampton succeeded Phelps in 2005.

The group has had three number one songs on the Singing News chart. "Yes, I Know" held the top position from July to October 1997, as did "I Will Go On" in November 2006. "Greatly Blessed" was their third number one single. The group has routinely performed classic Southern Gospel songs including many written by Bill and Gloria Gaither like "He Touched Me", "I Believe In A Hill Called Mount Calvary", and "Sinner Saved By Grace."

Reunion
In July 2008, the vocal band recorded a reunion DVD at the Gaither Studios — The Gaither Vocal Band Reunion, Volumes 1 and 2. Except for Jonathan Pierce, Terry Franklin, and Lemuel Miller, the former and present members appeared and performed. The two CDs debuted in the top two positions on Billboards Contemporary Christian Album chart, marking the Gaither Vocal Band's first No. 1 on the Christian Album chart. The DVDs of the same title debuted in the No. 1 and No. 2 positions on the Music Video charts as well. It also garnered a Grammy Award for Best Southern, Country, Bluegrass Gospel Album.

The quintet

In January 2009, Marshall Hall and Guy Penrod left. Gaither brought back some former members: Michael English as lead vocal, Mark Lowry as baritone and David Phelps as tenor. The first album by this five-member version was Reunited, released in September 2009. It was also the first album of the vocal band ever to feature only songs written by Bill and Gloria Gaither. A live album called Better Day was released in January 2010. In August 2010, they released the long-awaited album called Greatly Blessed, followed by I Am A Promise, a children's album, released in August 2011. Their most recent album was Pure & Simple, released in September 2012.

In October 2013, it was announced that Mark Lowry and Michael English would be leaving the group to devote more time to their solo careers. English's departure was immediate whereas Lowry stayed on until they could find another baritone to replace him. Their last album as members, Hymns, was released in March 2014 and was nominated for a Grammy Award the following December. After their departure, several guests filled-in until two new members could be found. In January 2014, it was announced that Adam Crabb (of The Crabb Family) would join the group as the fourth member and lead singer. Todd Suttles joined the group as the baritone singer one month later. 

Following their formation, the new quintet would go on to release a limited edition album, The New Edition, which could only be purchased at concert performances. In October 2014, the group released their first album together, entitled Sometimes it Takes a Mountain. Five months later, that album was followed by a two-DVD live performance release and the release of their second album (a live performance album), Happy Rhythm. Upon release, the DVDs debuted at the top of Billboards Music Video chart (Sometimes it Takes a Mountain at #1 and Happy Rhythm at #2).  In August 2016, the group's album Better Together was released. 

In March 2017, it was announced that David Phelps would be leaving the group on April 1, and Reggie Smith would join the group as tenor.

In October 2017, this line-up released their first studio album, entitled We Have This Moment.

In October 2018, there was another Gaither Vocal Band Reunion. It was a two-day concert, recorded live. Except for Steve Green, all of the past and present members who were at the first reunion performed.

Members (past and present)

Line-ups

Timeline
Singers are listed in the following order: (1) tenor, (2) lead, (3) baritone, (4) bass.

Discography

Awards and nominations

Grammy Awards

GMA Dove Awards

References

External links
 

American Christian musical groups
Grammy Award winners
Musical groups established in 1981
Musical groups from Indiana
Southern gospel performers